The Mesophelliaceae are a family of truffle-fungi in the order Hysterangiales. The family contains 8 genera and 33 species.

References

Hysterangiales
Basidiomycota families